Ballari Tuskers also spelled as the Bellary Tuskers is a Karnataka Premier League Twenty20 cricket franchise owned by  with Arvind Venkatesh Reddy. Ballari Tuskers was bid in the 2014 auction conducted by KSCA  The team won the 2016 Karnataka Premier League defeating Hubli Tigers.

References

Karnataka Premier League
Indian club cricket teams
Sport in Karnataka